Domagoj Boljat (born 25 January 1991) is a Croatian football player who plays for HNK Sloga Mravince.

Club career
He made his Croatian First Football League debut for Zadar on 4 August 2013 in a game against Rijeka.

References

External links
 

1991 births
Footballers from Split, Croatia
Living people
Croatian footballers
Croatian expatriate footballers
Association football midfielders
HNK Hajduk Split players
NK Primorac 1929 players
NK Mosor players
NK Zadar players
RNK Split players
A.S. Bisceglie Calcio 1913 players
Croatian Football League players
First Football League (Croatia) players
Serie C players
Expatriate footballers in Italy
Croatian expatriate sportspeople in Italy